Australian Army officers receive a commission from the Governor-General of Australia, who is also the Commander-in-Chief of the Australian Defence Force.  The commission is signed by both the Governor-General and the Minister of Defence. Rank insignia for commissioned officers is identical to that of the British Army, with the addition of a band containing the word "Australia" beneath the insignia.

Ranks and rank grades
Officer ranks in the Australian Army are organised into grades for administrative and promotional purposes. The rank grades also give an indication of what that particular officer's role or position may be, although 'rank grade' is not an official term. The ranks are organised below from highest to lowest:

Appointed Officer ranks
 Governor General of Australia. This rank is the highest appointed rank in the Australian Army, and is its Commander-in-Chief.
 State Governor. This rank insignia is worn by state governors.
 Field Marshal (Abbreviated: FM) – O11. This rank is generally reserved for wartime and ceremonial purposes; there are no regular appointments to the rank. Three men have been promoted to this rank in the Australian Army. Sir Thomas Blamey is the only Australian-born officer promoted to the rank. Lord Birdwood was promoted to the honorary rank of Field Marshal in the Australian Military Forces on 20 March 1925. Prince Philip, Duke of Edinburgh held the rank of Field Marshal in the Australian Army, but did not have any active role.

General Officer ranks
 General (Abbreviated: GEN) – O10. Since the end of the Second World War, this rank has only been held when an Army officer is appointed as Chief of the Defence Force.
 Lieutenant General (Abbreviated: LTGEN) – O9. Held by Chief of Army and, when Army officers are appointed to the Joint positions, Vice Chief of the Defence Force, Chief of Joint Operations and Chief of Capability Development.
 Major General (Abbreviated: MAJGEN) – O8.

Senior Officer ranks
 Brigadier (Abbreviated: BRIG) – O7. Like the United Kingdom, prior to 1922 Australia used the rank Brigadier General.
 Colonel (Abbreviated: COL) – O6.

Field Grade Officer ranks
 Lieutenant Colonel (Abbreviated: LTCOL) – O5. 
 Major (Abbreviated: MAJ) – O4.

Company Grade Officer ranks
 Captain (Abbreviated: CAPT) – O3.
 Lieutenant (Abbreviated: LT) – O2.
 Second Lieutenant (Abbreviated: 2LT) – O1.

The rank of second lieutenant has been phased out of the Australian Army, with officer recruits now graduating from the Royal Military College, Duntroon with the rank of lieutenant.

Officer Trainee rank
 Staff Cadet (Abbreviated SCDT)
 Officer Cadet (Abbreviated: OCDT)

Cadet rank insignia
SCDT and OCDT are equivalent rank titles. The rank of Officer Cadet is given to those who are studying at the Australian Defence Force Academy. Their rank is then changed to Staff Cadet upon entry to the Royal Military College, Duntroon (RMC-D) where they become a part of the Corps of Staff Cadets. Officer cadets wear a 10mm wide white stripe, on a DPCU slide or hard shoulder board, as their rank insignia. Officer Trainees in University Regiments undergoing Army Reserve Officer Training have also been known as Officer Cadets as of November, 2009. Previous to this they administratively belonged to RMC-D and were known as Staff Cadets. Staff Cadets are presently only full-time RMC-D officer trainees. Staff Cadets wear "RMC" on their rank slides in order to distinguish them from other training establishments.

Officer rank insignia of the Australian Army
The insignia worn by officers in the Australian Army use three symbols which are also used in the insignia of the British Army:
 The Star, commonly called a pip, is derived from the Star of the Knight Grand Cross of the Military Division of the Most Honourable Order of the Bath.
 The Crown has varied in the past, with the Tudor Crown being used from 1910 until 1953, when it was replaced by the St Edward's Crown from the coronation of Elizabeth II.
 The Crossed Sword and Baton has been in use by generals of the British Army since at least 1800.

Insignia

See also
 Australian Army enlisted rank insignia
 Australian Defence Force ranks
 List of Australian generals and brigadiers
 Uniforms of the Australian Army

References and notes

External links 
 ADF Badges of rank (copyright)

Australian Army